Petra Cetkovská and Alexandra Panova were the defending champions but decided not to participate.
Tímea Babos and Mandy Minella won the title, defeating Petra Martić and Kristina Mladenovic in the final, 6–3, 6–1.

Seeds

Draw

Draw

References
 Main Draw

Grand Prix SAR La Princesse Lalla Meryem - Doubles
2013 Doubles
2013 in Moroccan tennis